Robert Kemp may refer to:

Politicians
Sir Robert Kemp, 2nd Baronet (1627–1710), MP for Norfolk and Dunwich
Sir Robert Kemp, 3rd Baronet (1667–1734), MP for Dunwich and Suffolk
Sir Robert Kemp, 4th Baronet (1699–1752), MP for Orford
Robert Kemp, Labour MLA in the Ontario legislature

Others
Robert Kemp (literary critic) (1878–1959), French literary critic
Robert Kemp (playwright) (1908–1967), Scottish playwright
Robert S. Kemp, professor of finance
Robert G. Kemp (1928–1988), Canadian painter
Bobby Kemp (1959–1998), American football player
Robert "Father" Kemp, founder of the Old Folks Concerts

See also
Robert Kempe (c. 1526–1571), MP